George Mason Patriots men's basketball program dates to 1966. Basketball and athletics as a whole have contributed significantly to George Mason's popularity and success. The Patriots are the mascot and logo of George Mason University. The Patriots home court for both the men and women is at the EagleBank Arena, which is in Fairfax Virginia. The Patriots compete in the Atlantic 10 Conference. Until 2012–13, they competed in the Colonial Athletic Association, better known as the CAA. Both conferences are part of NCAA Division I sports. The men's team is coached by Kim English. The women's team is coached by Nyla Milleson.

History
The Patriots made a transition from the National Association of Intercollegiate Athletics NAIA to the National Collegiate Athletic Association NCAA Division II, and subsequently into the NCAA Division I rank in the 1978–79 season. According to the history of George Mason basketball, both the men's and women's basketball programs have been fixtures of campus life, and have all been enjoyed by students, parents, faculty, staff, other alumni. Although many of the school's athletic programs are enjoyed by George Mason Patriots and have had many of their own memorable moments, the men's basketball program remains the key sport at the University. The men's basketball team has played at the Patriot Center since 1985, and in prior years played at the PE Building on the west side of the Fairfax Campus.  George Mason has sent 3 players to the NBA since 1979.  Those being Rob Rose, Ricky Wilson, and Jason Miskiri.  George Mason has had numerous basketball players pursue post-college basketball careers overseas over the years, with many George Mason basketball alums still currently continuing their basketball careers overseas.

NCAA Tournament appearances
Men's
 Basketball (6), 1989, 1999, 2001, 2006, 2008 2011.

The Patriots have advanced to the NCAA tournament six times (1989, 1999, 2001, 2006,2008, and 2011) and the NIT tournament (National Invitation tournament) three times (1986, 2002 and 2004). The basketball team is best known for its 2006 NCAA Final Four appearance where Mason beat North Carolina, Connecticut, Michigan State, and Wichita State. The Patriots lost to the eventual champion Florida in the Final Four. After the Patriots run in the 2005–2006 season, and their successful finish in the 2007–2008 season, George Mason Head Coach Jim Larranaga was offered to leave Mason for a 5-year, $4.25 million offer from Providence College. Coach Larranaga announced his decision in April 2008 by declining the offer from Providence, and extending his current contract with Mason to 2015.

Final Four

George Mason celebrated the 2005–2006 basketball campaign, when they set a school-record by winning 27 games, going 27–8 on the year. That season the patriots were ranked top 25 in the USA Today and ESPN polls for the very first time. George Mason was ranked #8 in the final NCAA Basketball polls that year, making that Mason's highest ever ranking in men's basketball.  George Mason was nominated for 2 ESPY awards by ESPN.  The Patriots were nominated for an ESPY in the category of "Best Moment," for making the Final Four after downing three highly favored opponents. The run to the Final Four, which ESPN says is "considered by most the greatest in NCAA Tournament history", culminated with the Patriots beating top-seeded Connecticut 86–84 in overtime on March 26 to advance to the school, and the CAA conference's first-ever Final Four. George Mason also defeated Michigan State, North Carolina, and Wichita State in the NCAA Tournament while defeating the University of Connecticut in the Elite 8 to earn a trip to the Final Four in Indianapolis.  George Mason would later fall to the eventual National Champion, University of Florida, in the Final Four game.  While the Patriots were nominated for their virtuoso performance, the man who helped conduct the orchestra was also nominated for an ESPY as George Mason head men's basketball coach Jim Larranaga was nominated in the "Best Coach/Manager" category.

After the 2005–2006 season Head coach Jim Larranaga was named Virginia Coach of the Year on June 26, 2006. George Mason was one of only three teams since 1982 without a tournament win in its school history to still enter the final four. Georgia did it in 1983, and Virginia did it in 1981. During the 2005–2006 season the final four had a bigger following than the Super Bowl and the NBA Playoffs that year. The main following came from office pools and parties in houses, dorms, and bars.

George Mason women's basketball
In 2008, news broke out that women's basketball coach Debbie Taneyhill decided to resign to pursue other opportunities.
Coach Taneyhill spent 11 seasons as Mason's women's basketball head coach and had much success with the ladies. During Taneyhill's tenure as coach, she helped the lady Patriots to four-straight winning campaigns, from the 2000 to the 2004 season. She also led them to two post-season appearances in the Women's National Invitation Tournament, WNIT in 2001 and 2004, and was named 2001 Colonial Athletic Association Coach of the Year. 
She was the sixth coach in George Mason's 33-year history and was the only head coach to have 10 or more wins in each of her first eight seasons. She led the Patriots to the 2004 CAA Championship title game for just the third time in school history. Taneyhill ranks second all-time among Mason coaches in both wins and games coached.
During the 2005–2006 season George Mason University was selected to host the Colonial Athletic Association Women's Basketball Championship, to be played at the Patriot Center. It was the first time that George Mason served as host to the women's championship. In 2003 Mason Guard Jen Derevjanik advanced to the WNBA (Women's National Basketball Association). Derevjanik is one of few players ever in Mason's history to play in the WNBA. Jen wrapped up her second season with the WNBA's Connecticut Sun in 2005, where the Sun's competed in the WNBA finals for the second straight season. Derevjanik is the first Mason player to be part of a team that has advanced to the WNBA Finals.

All-time head coaches

Players

Notable player accomplishments

CAA PLAYER OF THE YEAR
1983 – Carlos Yates (Co-Player)
1988 – Kenny Sanders
1999 – George Evans
2000 – George Evans
2001 – George Evans
2012 – Ryan Pearson

CAA ROOKIE OF THE YEAR
1980 – Andy Bolden
1982 – Carlos Yates
1986 – Kenny Sanders
1994 – Curtis McCants
1995 – Nate Langley
1998 – George Evans

ALL-CAA (ECAC South Conf., 1980–85)
1980 – Andre Gaddy
1982 – Carlos Yates
1983 – Carlos Yates
1984 – Carlos Yates, Ricky Wilson
1985 – Carlos Yates, Rob Rose (2nd), Ricky Wilson (2nd)
1986 – Rob Rose, Ricky Wilson (2nd)
1987 – Kenny Sanders
1988 – Kenny Sanders, Amp Davos (2nd)
1989 – Kenny Sanders
1990 – Robert Dykes, Mike Hargett (2nd), Steve Smith (2nd)
1991 – Robert Dykes, Byron Tucker (2nd)
1995 – Nate Langley (2nd)
1996 – Curtis McCants
1997 – Nate Langley
1998 – George Evans (2nd), Jason Miskiri (2nd)
1999 – George Evans, Jason Miskiri
2000 – George Evans, Erik Herring (2nd)
2001 – George Evans, Erik Herring
2002 – Jesse Young
2003 – Mark Davis (2nd)
2004 – Jai Lewis, Mark Davis (2nd)
2005 – Jai Lewis (2nd), Lamar Butler (2nd), Tony Skinn (3rd)
2006 – Jai Lewis, Tony Skinn (2nd)
2007 – Will Thomas (2nd), Folarin Campbell (3rd)
2008 – Will Thomas, Folarin Campbell (2nd)
2009 – John Vaughan (2nd), Darryl Monroe (2nd), Cam Long (3rd)
2010 – Cam Long (2nd)
2011 – Cam Long (1st), Ryan Pearson (2nd), Luke Hancock (3rd)

Statistics

All-time leaders

Points

Rebounds

Assists

Men's All-time standings

References

George Mason Patriots basketball